Scouting for Boys: A handbook for instruction in good citizenship is a book on Boy Scout training, published in various editions since 1908. Early editions were written and illustrated by Robert Baden-Powell with later editions being extensively rewritten by others. The book was originally a manual for self-instruction in observation, tracking and woodcraft skills as well as  self-discipline and self-improvement, about the British Empire and duty as citizens with an eclectic mix of anecdotes and unabashed personal observations and recollections. It is pervaded by a degree of moral proselytizing and references to the author's own exploits. It is based on his boyhood experiences, his experience with the Mafeking Cadet Corps during the Second Boer War at the siege of Mafeking, and on his experimental camp on Brownsea Island, England.

History
Scouting for Boys (1908) was Baden-Powell's rewrite of his earlier book Aids to Scouting (1899) with many youth training ideas openly taken from The Birch Bark Roll of the Woodcraft Indians (1906) written by Ernest Thompson Seton, who later became the Chief Scout of the Boy Scouts of America. Aids to Scouting was mostly a written explanation of the military scouting and self-reliance skills lessons Baden-Powell had learned from Frederick Russell Burnham, the British Army Chief of Scouts, but following the siege of Mafeking this military handbook unexpectedly became popular with many youth groups and educators, like Charlotte Mason, in Britain. At Mafeking, Baden-Powell's adjutant had recruited and trained boys aged 12–15 as cadets and during the siege they acted as postmen, messengers, and later to carry the wounded, to free men for fighting. Upon his return to England, following the Second Boer War, Baden-Powell learned some British schools had been using Aids to Scouting to teach observation and deduction. In 1906, Seton discussed youth training ideas with Baden-Powell and shared with him a copy of The Birch Bark Roll of the Woodcraft Indians. Soon after, Baden-Powell decided to revise Aids to Scouting into a book for boys. Several friends supported Baden-Powell, including Sir William Alexander Smith, founder of the Boys' Brigade, Cyril Arthur Pearson, who owned newspapers and printing presses, and the novelist Maria Fetherstonhaugh, who provided a quiet Wimbledon house where he could write. Baden-Powell wrote a draft, then called Boy Patrols, which he used and tested with 22 boys for one week at camp on Brownsea Island in the summer of 1907, where Pearson's literary editor Percy Everett assisted.

Scouting for Boys was published in six fortnightly  of approximately 70 pages each, from January to March 1908. They were produced by Pearson's printer, Horace Cox. These six publications were a success and, as planned, were issued in book form on 1 May 1908. Although Aids to Scouting strongly influenced the book, Scouting for Boys presents Scouting from the perspective of outdoorsmen and explorers rather than military men, and it adds the Scout Oath, Scout Law, honours and games for youth. The book was revised and an enormous variety of editions were published. Many of these editions were edited by others and, far beyond mere editing, whole sections were written by authors other than Baden-Powell. The book was a best seller upon release, and, in its various editions, is claimed to have become one of the best-selling books in history. Scouting for Boys has been translated into many languages. In 1948, editions of the book were still selling 50,000 copies annually. Only in 1967 was a decline noted by the publisher and in the last decades of the 20th century the book came to be seen as a period curiosity even by the Scout Movement. It is claimed to be the fourth bestselling book of the 20th century. A realistic estimate is that  approximately 4 million copies of the UK edition have been sold. Extrapolating this to 87 different language editions worldwide, historic world sales of Scouting for Boys can be estimated at 100 to 150 million copies since 1908.

In her introduction to the 2005 edition, Elleke Boehmer criticises the book saying "the text was deeply scored through with a contemporary class prejudice which would have been off-putting to non-middle-class readers, as captured in the sharp aphorism that bees form a 'model community, for they respect their Queen and kill their unemployed' (p. 117) Character observation in many ways meant reading for the signs of working-class poverty."

Editions
Scouting for Boys has been published in over thirty consecutive editions by London based C. Arthur Pearson Ltd., and it is translated to all the major languages of the world. Estimatedly, over 100 million books have been printed, making it rank high in the list of best-selling books. The internet page www.scoutingforboysroundtheworld.org has identified more than 300 different editions and included them in a database accessible via this internet page. Users can also add missing editions to the database themselves.

British editions

 plus advertisements

Other editions

Contents
All parts of the six installments in 1908 have the title Scouting for Boys in big capitals. With a listed price of '4d. net', it was affordable to many boys, many of whom would have been at work, as the school-leaving age was 14. Authorship is attributed thus: 'by B-P (Lieut. Gen. Baden Powell C.B.)' (sic).

Most chapters start with hints to instructors. All chapters have campfire yarns, appealing to boys, most contain sections with games and activities, and they close with recommendations for books to read.

Part I. Scoutcraft
The first installment contains pages 3 to 70. It provides the basic details of Scouting.

Part II. Tracking, Woodcraft
The second part covers pages 71 to 142. It contains chapter II on tracking and chapter III on woodcraft, each with three camp fire yarns.

Part III. Camp life, Campaigning
The third part covers pages 143 to 206. It contains chapter IV on camp life, and chapter V on campaigning.

Part IV. Endurance and chivalry
The fourth part covers pages 207 to 270. It contains chapter VI Endurance for Scouts, or How to be strong, and chapter VII Chivalry of the knights.

Part V. Saving life and patriotism
The fifth part covers pages 271 to 334. It contains chapter VIII Saving life, or how to deal with accidents, and chapter IX Patriotism, or our duties as citizens.

Part VI. Notes for instructors, Scouting games, practices, and displays 
The sixth part covers pages 335 to 398. It contains Notes to instructors and Scouting games, practices, and displays.

Copyright status
The Scout Association owned the legal copyright to Scouting for Boys in the UK, until 31 December 2011, when the copyright expired at the end of the 70th year after the death of its author on 8 January 1941. The book is now in the public domain. Until then it could only be reproduced after permission was granted from the Scout Association headquarters, other than for copyright exceptions in specific countries, such as fair use. The Boy Scouts of America were granted a special copyright licence by Baden-Powell himself for their Boy Scout Handbook, written during the BSA's formal founding in 1910.

See also

 The Wolf Cub's Handbook (1916), for Wolf Cubs (Cub Scouts)
 Rovering to Success (1922), for Rovers
 Aids to Scoutmastership (1920), for Scoutmasters
 Baden-Powell (1989) – biography of Baden-Powell

References

External links
 Full on-line text of Scouting for Boys by The Dump, resources for Scouting
 Scouting for Boys 'Round the world, worldwide overview of editions of Scouting for Boys

Scouting
1908 non-fiction books